Fatma Yıldırım (born 3 January 1990) is a Turkish volleyball player.

She participated at the 2016 FIVB Volleyball World Grand Prix, and 2017 FIVB Volleyball World Grand Prix.

Career 
She played for the Florida State University.

Clubs

References

External links 
 FIVB profile

1995 births
Living people
Turkish women's volleyball players
Florida State Seminoles women's volleyball players